Parallel and counter parallel chords are terms derived from the German (Parallelklang, Gegenparallelklang) to denote what is more often called in English the "relative", and possibly the "counter relative" chords. In Hugo Riemann's theory, and in German theory more generally, these chords share the function of the chord to which they link: subdominant parallel, dominant parallel, and tonic parallel. Riemann defines the relation in terms of the movement of one single note:

The tonic, subdominant, and dominant chords, in root position, each followed by its parallel. The parallel is formed by raising the fifth a whole tone.

The minor tonic, subdominant, dominant, and their parallels, created by lowering the fifth (German)/root (US) a whole tone.

The parallel chord (but not the counter parallel chord) of a major chord will always be the minor chord whose root is a minor third down from the major chord's root, inversely the parallel chord of a minor chord will be the major chord whose root is a minor third up from the root of the minor chord. Thus, in a major key, where the dominant is a major chord, the dominant parallel will be the minor chord a minor third below the dominant. In a minor key, where the dominant may be a minor chord, the dominant parallel will be the major chord a minor third above the (minor) dominant.

The name "parallel chord" comes from the German musical theory, where "Paralleltonart" means not "parallel key" but "relative key", and "parallel key" is "Varianttonart".

Counter parallel

The "counter parallel" or "contrast chord" is terminology used in German theory derived mainly from Hugo Riemann to refer to (US:) relative (German: parallel) diatonic functions and is abbreviated Tcp in major and tCp in minor (Tkp respectively tKp in Riemann's diction). The chord can be seen as the "tonic parallel reversed" and is in a major key the same chord as the dominant parallel (Dp) and in a minor key equal to the subdominant parallel (sP); yet, it has another function. According to Riemann the chord is derived through  Leittonwechselklänge (German, literally: "leading-tone changing sounds"), sometimes called gegenklang or "contrast chord", abbreviated Tl in major and tL in minor, or, in German literature, abbreviated Tg in major and tG in minor (standing for "Gegenklang" or "Gegenparallel"). If chords may be formed by raising (major) or lowering (minor) the fifth a whole step ["parallel" or relative chords], they may also be formed by lowering (major) or raising (minor) the root a half-step to wechsel, the leading tone or leitton.

Major Leittonwechselklänge, formed by lowering the root a half step.

Minor Leittonwechselklänge, formed by raising the root (US)/fifth (German) a half step.

For example, Am is the tonic parallel of C, thus, Em is the counter parallel of C. The usual parallel chord in a major key is a minor third below the root and the counter parallel is a major third above. In a minor key the intervals are reversed: the tonic parallel (e.g. Eb in Cm) is a minor third above, and the counter parallel (e.g. Ab in Cm) is a major third below. Both the parallel and the counter parallel have two notes in common with the tonic (Am and C share C & E; Em and C share E & G).

A chord should be analysed as a Tcp rather than Dp or sP particularly at cadential points, for example at an interrupted cadence, where it substitutes the tonic. It is most easily recognised in a minor key since it creates an ascending semitone step at the end of the cadence by moving from the major dominant chord to the minor counter parallel:

    Ex.
    t  - s  - D - tCp
    Em - Am - B - C
    where C is located a major third below Em

    Ex.
    T  - S  - D - tCp
    F  - Bb - C - Db
    where Db is located a major third below the minor tonic Fm

In four-part harmony, the Tcp usually has a doubled third to avoid consecutive fifths or octaves. This further emphasises its coherency with the tonic, since the third of the minor key counter parallel is the same as the tonic root which thus is doubled.

See also
Borrowed chord
Chord substitution
Chromatic mediant
Closely related key
Enharmonic
Harmonic parallelism
List of major/minor compositions
Subsidiary chord
Voice leading

References

External links
"Chord Functions", NiklasAndreasson.se.
“A Guide to the Terminology of German Harmony”, in Studies on the Origin of Harmonic Tonality, pp. xi–xv (Princeton: Princeton Univ. Press, 1990). "Published Papers", Robert Gjerdingen.

Chords
Diatonic functions
Riemannian theory

de:Parallelklang
pt:Notas relativas
sv:Funktionsanalys (musik)#Parallellackord